Hitu Kanodia (born 21 February 1970) is Gujarati film actor and politician from Gujarat, India.

Biography
Hitu Kanodia was born on 21 February 1970 to actor-politician Naresh Kanodia and Ratan Kanodia. He has studied 12th grade. He started his film career as a child artist. He has acted in over 100 Gujarati films.

He contested from Kadi constituency in 2012 Gujarat Legislative Assembly election but lost. He was elected as a member of the Gujarat Legislative Assembly in 2017 election from Idar constituency.

Personal life
Hitu Kanodia married actress Mona Thiba on 14 August 2014 in Ahmedabad. They have a son, Rajveer, born in 2015.

Selected filmography 
As a child artist

 Dholi (12)
 Saiba Mora
 Dhola Maru
 Meru Mulade
 Ujali Meraman
 Vanzari Vav
 Dharmo
 Meru Mulade
 Jog sanjog
 Lekhne mathe mekh
 Sati Aur Bhagwan (Hindi)
 Sanp tyan Jump
 Vat, Vachan and Ver
 Jugal jodi
 Meru Malan (1985)
 Raj Kunwar

As an actor

 Saajan Tane Mara Sam
Mandanio morVahurani
 Janmo Janam
 Raj Ratan
 Govaliyo
 Lakhtarni ladi ne Vilayatno var
 Senthinu sindoor
 Ma te ma bija vagdana va
 Man, Moti ne kach
 Dadane Aangan Tulsi
 Dikri to parki thapan kahevay
 Me to dungar kleine ghar re karya
 Kaydo
 Vagi kale katar tara premni
 Vaagya Preetuna Dhol
 Rajveer – rahasyamay premktha
 Chare disha cheharma (2000)
 Hal Bheru America
 No tension
 Nahin re chute taro saath
 Daldu didhu me kartakna melama
 Garibni dikri, sasariyama thikri
 Raado (2022)
 Madhav (2022)
 Vash (2023)
 Hu (2023)

Awards 
 Award for Best Child Artist for the film "Meru Mulade" (1980–81)
 Award for Best Child Artist for the film "Jugal Jodi" (Combined with Bhavik Vyas) (1982–83)
 Award for Best Child Artist for the film "Ujali Meraman" (1985–86)
Award for Best Actor for the film " Saajan Tane Mara Sam "

References

Gujarat MLAs 2017–2022
Indian male film actors
1970 births
Living people
Male actors in Gujarati-language films
Male actors from Gujarat
People from Patan district
Kanodia family
Bharatiya Janata Party politicians from Gujarat